Coccotrypes flavicornis, is a species of weevil found in Sri Lanka.

Description
Pronotum more elongate, and not steeply convex anteriorly. Pronotum without a pronounced summit near the middle therefore summit is close to the base. Elytral declivity is less steep.

References 

Curculionidae
Insects of Sri Lanka
Insects described in 1895